Time & Tide is a 2006 documentary film from Tuvalu.

Production
The creators, Julie Bayer and Josh Salzman, got the idea for Time & Tide in 2000 after reading about how the island nation of Tuvalu had sold the .tv domain name for US$50 million.

The anthropologist Niko Besnier was interviewed for the film; he claimed that he was excluded because he would not go along with the Orientalist "disappearing culture" narrative favoured by the filmmakers.

Synopsis

The documentary sees a group of Tuvaluan New Zealanders on a journey back to the homeland. On arriving in Funafuti, they see how the country has been changed by economic development, imported goods, Western culture and the impending sea level rise due to global warming.

Release
Time & Tide was premiered on 24 July 2006 at the New Zealand International Film Festival.

It won the Best Documentary Prize at the Big Muddy Film Festival and a Special Jury Prize at the Sidewalk Film Festival; it also screened at the Hawaii International Film Festival.

Film Threat said that "Time & Tide doesn’t overstay its welcome, nor does it feel rushed as it presents us this tragic, yet peaceful and gorgeously shot, film that never jumps up on the soapbox to violently jam a message down our throats. Instead, the filmmakers let the message speak for itself and it’s in the quiet concern of the Tuvaluan people."

See also
Climate change in Tuvalu

References

External links
 

2006 documentary films
Films set in Tuvalu
Films shot in Tuvalu